Trogoderma glabrum, known generally as the glabrous cabinet beetle or colored cabinet beetle, is a species of carpet beetle in the family Dermestidae. It is found in Europe and Northern Asia (excluding China) and North America.

References

Further reading

External links

 

Dermestidae
Articles created by Qbugbot
Beetles described in 1783